The Philadelphia Flyers are a professional ice hockey team based in Philadelphia, Pennsylvania. They are members of the Metropolitan Division of the National Hockey League's (NHL) Eastern Conference. The Flyers were founded in 1967 as one of six expansion teams, increasing the size of the NHL at that time to 12 teams.

Key

Career

Single season

Player

Team

Single game

Player

Team

Single period

Player

Team

Streaks

Player

Team

Single playoff series

Player

Team

Notes

References

Records
National Hockey League statistical records
Records